The 2018 season was the 97th in the Cruzeiro Esporte Clube's existence. Along with the Campeonato Brasileiro Série A, the club also competed in the Campeonato Mineiro, the Copa do Brasil and the Copa Libertadores.

On 17 October, Cruzeiro won their 6th Copa do Brasil title after defeating Corinthians 2–1 at Arena Corinthians, becoming the biggest champions of the tournament history and the first to win it twice in a row.

Competitions

Overview

Campeonato Mineiro

First stage

Knockout phase

Quarter-final

Semi-finals

Final

Campeonato Brasileiro Série A

League table

Results by round

Matches

Copa do Brasil 

As Cruzeiro participated in the 2018 Copa Libertadores, the club entered the Copa do Brasil in the round of 16, whose draw was held on 20 April.

Round of 16

Quarter-finals

Semi-finals

Final

Copa Libertadores 

The group stage draw for the 2018 Copa Libertadores was made on 20 December 2017. Cruzeiro were drawn into Group E with Universidad de Chile, Racing and Vasco da Gama.

Group stage

Knockout stage 

The draw for the knockout stages of the Copa Libertadores was held on 4 June.

Round of 16

Quarter-finals

References

External links 
 Cruzeiro Esporte Clube
 Cruzeiro official website (in Portuguese)

Brazilian football clubs 2018 season
2018 Cruzeiro Esporte Clube season